John Matthew Deehan (born 6 August 1957) is an English former football manager and player.

During his playing career he was a footballer from 1975 until 1990 and is most well known for his spells as a striker for Aston Villa and Norwich City. He also played for West Bromwich Albion, Ipswich Town, Manchester City and Barnsley. He was also capped seven times at England U21 level, scoring six goals.

Since retiring Deehan initially returned to Norwich as a coach and had a spell as manager during their 1994/95 Premier League campaign before later managing Wigan Athletic to a Division Three title and a caretaker spell in charge of Aston Villa. He has since held roles as the director of football of Northampton Town, Lincoln City, Grimsby Town and Plymouth Argyle, as well as actively being part of the coaching staff at Kettering Town and Sheffield Wednesday.

Career

As a player
Born in Solihull, as a player Deehan was a striker who is best known for productive spells with Aston Villa and Norwich City. With Villa he was a member of the team that won the 1977 Football League Cup Final against Everton and was a member of the Norwich sides which won the 1985 Football League Cup Final and the Second Division championship in 1986. On 24 January 2012 he was appointed as Director of Football at League Two club Plymouth Argyle. Argyle stood at 22nd in League Two at the time of his appointment.

He was a competent goalscorer from an early age, breaking the 10-goal barrier in the league for three successive seasons by the age of 22. He was initially less successful after leaving Villa Park in September 1979 to sign for Villa's local rivals West Bromwich Albion, managing just five goals from 47 league games over the next two years, but recaptured his form after joining Norwich City in December 1981 and helping them seal promotion to the First Division that season. He scored 20 league goals in his first full season at Carrow Road and managed 15 and 13 goals over the next two seasons, although he was unable to save the Canaries from relegation in 1984–85. He also helped them win the Football League Cup in 1985 and the Second Division title - and a return to the First Division as Second Division champions a year later.

In 2002, Norwich fans voted Deehan into the Norwich City F.C. Hall of Fame in recognition of his contribution as a player.

In the summer of 1986, he left Norwich to join Ipswich Town in a player exchange deal that saw Trevor Putney move to Carrow Road. His final season at Norwich had seen him collected a Second Division title medal, but his form was less impressive than in previous seasons with just four goals from 26 league games.

From 1988 until 1990 he was player-coach at Manchester City, where he worked under the management of former Norwich assistant Mel Machin, before returning to Norwich City as Mike Walker's assistant in the summer of 1992.

Management and Coaching
He helped coach an unfancied Canaries side to a surprise third-place finish in the inaugural FA Premier League (season 1992–93), and was promoted to the manager's seat the following January when Walker moved to Everton. Norwich finished 12th in the Premiership in 1993-94 and started the following season reasonably well despite the (then) record English sale of Chris Sutton to Blackburn Rovers for £5 million. Despite the loss of Sutton, and the sale of Efan Ekoku shortly afterwards, the Canaries were seventh in the Premiership by Christmas and were in contention for a UEFA Cup place. An injury to goalkeeper Bryan Gunn then sparked a dramatic loss of form, and by the time the Canaries lost 3–0 to Newcastle United on 8 April 1995, they were heading for the relegation zone. Deehan then stepped down as manager and handed the reins to his assistant Gary Megson, but Megson was unable to stave off relegation.

Deehan's absence from football did not last long. He began the 1995–96 season as manager of Wigan Athletic in the Football League Third Division, and after two seasons at the helm he guided them to the Division Three title and promotion to Division Two. After safeguarding Wigan's survival in 1997–98, he accepted the assistant manager's job at Sheffield United and for one season worked under Steve Bruce. Deehan's time at Bramall Lane was unsuccessful and he resigned after the club failed to get near the Division One playoff places.

After leaving Sheffield United, Deehan worked again with Steve Bruce at Huddersfield Town, in the 1999–2000 season. After leaving the Yorkshire club, he made a football comeback with Aston Villa when he was appointed assistant manager to John Gregory in July 2001. In January 2002, Deehan was named joint caretaker manager of Villa (with Stuart Gray) when Gregory resigned. He left the club when Graham Taylor was named Villa manager for the second time.

In October 2003, Deehan became Director of Football at Northampton Town, with Colin Calderwood working under him as team manager. The duo were appointed to get the team promoted from the league's basement division, and achieved this aim in the 2005–06 season. Both Calderwood and Deehan left the club at the end of the 2005–06 season, with Deehan moving to Lincoln City as Director of Football. On 15 October 2007, it was confirmed that Deehan and Lincoln City manager John Schofield had left the club. In November 2007, Deehan was employed as a scout by Premier League side Bolton Wanderers who were looking for a number of former professionals to head their recruitment drive led by former Everton manager Colin Harvey.

In September 2008, Deehan expressed interest in the vacant manager's post at League Two side Grimsby Town, saying: "I think Grimsby Town is a good club and a good opportunity for any manager. Whenever I've been to Blundell Park, I've been impressed with the set-up and the positive approach to football." Despite his interest Deehan failed to land the Grimsby job, which was given to Mike Newell.

On 21 January 2009, he was appointed as Chief Scout of Norwich City Football Club in part of the new management team alongside three of his former players – Bryan Gunn as First Team Manager, Ian Crook as first team coach  and Ian Butterworth as Assistant Manager.

In December 2009, Deehan became Lee Harper's assistant at Kettering Town but was controversially sacked later that month immediately following a 5–1 defeat to Leeds United in an FA Cup second-round replay where his choice of substitutions during extra time were blamed by Kettering owner Imraan Ladak for the defeat.

On 17 March 2010, he was announced as Head of Recruitment (Director of Football) at Grimsby Town in order to work with manager Neil Woods and his assistant Chris Casper. It was touted that Deeham would be a possible replacement for Woods if the club are relegated from the Football League. However, after the conclusion of the 09/10 season, which eventually brought relegation Deehan's contract was not renewed and he left the club 20 May 2010.

On 25 January 2012, Deehan was appointed Director of Football at Plymouth Argyle. At the end of the 2012–2013 season he left the club. He teamed up with Stuart Gray again early in 2014, joining the coaching staff at Sheffield Wednesday.

Personal life
In March 2022, his family have said for the last 6 years that Deehan has been battling with dementia.

References

External links
Career information at ex-canaries.co.uk

1957 births
Living people
Sportspeople from Solihull
English footballers
England under-21 international footballers
Association football forwards
Aston Villa F.C. players
West Bromwich Albion F.C. players
Norwich City F.C. players
Ipswich Town F.C. players
Manchester City F.C. players
Barnsley F.C. players
English football managers
Norwich City F.C. managers
Wigan Athletic F.C. managers
Aston Villa F.C. managers
Premier League managers
Manchester City F.C. non-playing staff
Barnsley F.C. non-playing staff
Huddersfield Town A.F.C. non-playing staff
Bolton Wanderers F.C. non-playing staff
Lincoln City F.C. non-playing staff
Grimsby Town F.C. non-playing staff
Sheffield United F.C. non-playing staff
People with dementia